USS LST-666 was an  built for the United States Navy in World War II. Like most ships of her class, she was not named and properly known only by her designation. Because of the biblical reference to the number, "666" in the Bible's Book of Revelation, USS LST-666 earned the unofficial nicknames, "The Devil's Ship" and "The Devil Ship".

Construction and commissioning
LST-666 was laid down on 16 February 1944 at Ambridge, Pennsylvania, by the American Bridge Company. She was launched on 24 April 1944, sponsored by Mrs. A. I. Hay, and commissioned on 16 May 1944.

Service history
During World War II, LST-666 was assigned to the Asiatic-Pacific theater and participated in the following operations:

 Western New Guinea operation: (Morotai landings), Halmahera Island, North Maluku, 15 September 1944
 Leyte operation: (Leyte landings) - Tacloban, 16 to 30 October and 9 to 29 November 1944
 Luzon operation: (Lingayen Gulf landings), 4 to 18 January 1945
 Manila Bay-Bicol operation: (Zambales-Subic Bay landings), La Paz, Bataan, 29 to 30 January 1945
 Consolidation and capture of the Southern Philippines: (Palawan Island landings), Puerto Princesa, 1 to 2 March 1945; (Visayas Island landings) - Iloilo, Panay Island and Pulupandan, Negros Island, 18 March and 29 March to 1 April 1945
 Borneo operation: (Balikpapan operation), East Kalimantan, 26 June to 9 July 1945

Decommissioning and disposal
Following the war, LST-666 was decommissioned on 20 June 1946 and struck from the Navy List on 31 July 1946. On 26 September 1946, the ship was sold for scrap to Sun Shipbuilding & Dry Dock Co., of Chester, Pennsylvania.

Honors and awards
LST-666 earned six battle stars for World War II service.

References

External links

LST-542-class tank landing ships
World War II amphibious warfare vessels of the United States
Ships built in Ambridge, Pennsylvania
1944 ships